Einar Olsen may refer to:

 Einar Olsen (gymnast) (1893–1949), Danish Olympic gymnast
 Einar Olsen (editor) (born 1936), Norwegian newspaper editor
 Einar Olsson (footballer), Swedish footballer